The Lariat Kid is a lost 1929 American silent Western film directed by B. Reeves Eason and starring Hoot Gibson. It was produced and distributed by Universal Pictures.

Cast
 Hoot Gibson as Tom Richards
 Ann Christy as Mary Lou
 Cap Anderson as Scar Hagerty
 Mary Foy as Aunt Bella
 Walter Brennan as Pat O'Shea
 Andy Waldron as George Carson
 Bud Osborne as Trigger Finger
 Joseph Bennett as Pecos Kid
 Jim Corey as Jackknife
 Francis Ford as Cal Gregg
 Joe Rickson as Tony

References

External links
 
 

1929 films
Films directed by B. Reeves Eason
Universal Pictures films
1929 Western (genre) films
Lost Western (genre) films
Lost American films
American black-and-white films
1929 lost films
Silent American Western (genre) films
1920s American films